TDF 1 or TDF-1 was a French communications satellite which was to have been operated by Télévision de France (France Télécom). It was intended to be used to provide television broadcast services to Europe, however it failed before entering service. It was constructed by Aérospatiale, based on the Spacebus 300 satellite bus, and carried five Ku-band transponders.

Launch 
TDF 1 was launched by Arianespace using an Ariane 2 launch vehicle flying from ELA-1 at Centre Spatial Guyanais, Kourou, French Guiana. The launch took place at 02:17:00 UTC on 28 October 1988. It was a Spacebus 300 satellite bus.

Mission 
TDF 1 was placed into a geostationary orbit at a longitude of 19.2° West.

See also 

 1988 in spaceflight

References 

Satellites of France